Kezdy or Kézdy is a Hungarian surname. Notable people with the surname include: 

 György Kézdy (1936–2013), Hungarian actor
 Pierre Kezdy (1962–2020), American bass player

Hungarian-language surnames